Bothriocline longipes is a woody perennial herb or shrub capable of reaching three meters tall. It is part of the Asteraceae family.

Description 
Woody herb or shrub, leaves, opposite,  petiole is up to 2.5 cm long; leaf-blade is narrowly ovate with an acute apex and a base that is cuneate to rounded. Flowers, corolla is lilac, mauve or bright purple colored

Chemistry 
Compounds isolated from the flowers of the species shows the presence of anthocyanidins. Oil extracted from the seed of Bothriocline longipes was identified to contain non epoxy tri-glycerides and epoxy acids.

Uses 
Extracts of the species are used as ingredients of a regimen of herbal remedies to treat a variety of pain or inflammatory related issues. Leaf extracts are used in managing colic pains, diarrhea, syphilis and conjunctivitis. Parts of root is chewed to ameliorate sore throat.

References 

Flora of West Tropical Africa
Vernonieae
Taxa named by N. E. Brown